Harold Johnston (1 May 1895 – 3 July 1978) was an Australian rules footballer who played for North Melbourne in the Victorian Football League (VFL) during the 1920s.

Johnston was with North Melbourne from their inaugural VFL season in 1925 but as a result of them being an inexperienced club, he only experienced six wins in his 37-game career. One of those victories, against Hawthorn, was Wels Eicke's 200th and they won largely due to Johnston's career best four goal haul.

As a VFL field umpire, Johnston appeared three times in 1930 and also officiated in a further three matches on the boundary in 1931.

References

Holmesby, Russell and Main, Jim (2007). The Encyclopedia of AFL Footballers. 7th ed. Melbourne: Bas Publishing.

1895 births
1978 deaths
North Melbourne Football Club players
Australian Football League umpires
Australian players of Australian rules football